The Nuyakuk River is a  tributary of the Nushagak River in southwestern Alaska, United States. From its source at Tikchik Lake, an extension of Nuyakuk Lake in Wood-Tikchik State Park, it flows eastward into the larger river upstream of Koliganek.

Recreation
Many kinds of watercraft can be used for boating on the Nuyakuk. The Alaska River Guide describes the stream as "an excellent river for families or novices, with experience in portaging...especially those who enjoy fishing." The segments of the Nuyakuk that require portages occur along the upper  of the stream below Tikchik Lake. Two sections of Class II (medium) water on the International Scale of River Difficulty are along this part of the river. Below this, the river plunges over a  series of ledges in a sequence rated Class IV (very difficult) to V (extremely difficult). Beyond these rapids and ledges, the river is Class I (easy) all the way to the mouth.

Game fish inhabiting the Nuyakuk include rainbow trout, char, Arctic grayling, silver salmon, king salmon, and lake trout. Anglers generally reach the river by floatplane or boat; accommodations include a private lodge along the upper river. There are good campsites except along the lower river near the mouth.

See also
List of rivers of Alaska

References

Rivers of Dillingham Census Area, Alaska
Rivers of Alaska
Rivers of Unorganized Borough, Alaska